Nagesh may refer to the following Indian men:

Nagesh (actor)
Nagesh Kukunoor
Nagesh Bhonsle
Purushottam Nagesh Oak
Kududula Nagesh 
B.S. Nagesh
Lambu Nagesh
Nagesh Patle

Nagesh may also refer to Nagesh Thiraiyarangam, an Indian Tamil-language horror drama film.